Multifocal lymphangioendotheliomatosis, also known as congenital cutaneovisceral angiomatosis with thrombocytopenia, and multifocal lymphangioendotheliomatosis with thrombocytopenia, is a skin condition that presents at birth with hundreds of red-brown plaques as large as several centimeters.

See also 
 Skin lesion
 List of cutaneous conditions

References

 

Dermal and subcutaneous growths